"What I Am" is a song written by Edie Brickell and Kenny Withrow and recorded by Edie Brickell & New Bohemians for their debut album, Shooting Rubberbands at the Stars (1988). The song is highlighted by a guitar solo that notably features an envelope filter. It peaked at number seven on the US Billboard Hot 100, topped the Canadian RPM Top Singles chart, and became a top-twenty hit in Australia and New Zealand. "What I Am" was ranked number 23 on VH1's list of the "100 Greatest One-Hit Wonders of the 80s".

English music duo Tin Tin Out collaborated with Spice Girl Emma Bunton to release a cover of "What I Am" in November 1999. This version became the more successful one in the UK, peaking at number two on the UK Singles Chart and receiving a Silver certification from the British Phonographic Industry.

Composition
"What I Am" is written in the key of B minor in  time with a tempo of 89 beats per minute.  The song follows a chord progression of B–D–A, and the vocals span from G3 to B4.

Critical reception
Betty Page from Record Mirror wrote, "Like so many other singles this week, this is pleasantly quirky but not terribly inspiring. Edie's yet another female singer/songstress who sings and strums a guitar in a rustic fashion which makes you forget what the song sounds like before it's finished."  Cash Box called it "one of the catchiest, anti-philosophical, tongue-in-cheek ditties since Peggy Lee's 'Is That All There Is?.'"

Track listings
US, European, and Australian 7-inch single; US cassette single
A. "What I Am" (LP version) – 4:54
B. "I Do" (LP version) – 2:00

Canadian and UK 7-inch single
A. "What I Am" (edit) – 3:43
B. "I Do" (LP version) – 2:00

12-inch and European mini-CD single
 "What I Am" (LP version)
 "I Do" (LP version)
 "Walk on the Wild Side" – 5:52

Personnel 
New Bohemians
 Edie Brickell – vocals
 Kenny Withrow – guitar
 Brad Houser – bass guitar
 Brandon Aly – drums
 John Bush – percussion

Additional personnel
 Robbie Blunt – guitar
 Chris Whitten – drums
 Paul "Wix" Wickens – keyboards
 John Henry – background vocals

Charts

Weekly charts

Year-end charts

Tin Tin Out and Emma Bunton version

The song was covered by English electronic music duo Tin Tin Out and English singer Emma Bunton. It was released on November 1, 1999, as the second single from Tin Tin Out's second studio album, Eleven to Fly (1999). It also appeared on Bunton's debut solo album, A Girl Like Me (2001). Bunton recorded her vocals at London's Sarm West Studios in June 1999. The collaboration was the first release for Bunton to appear as a solo artist.

Tin Tin Out and Bunton's version debuted and peaked at number two on the UK Singles Chart, 29 places higher than the original version 10 years previously. It sold 106,300 copies during its first week of release and has sold over 234,000 copies in the UK. "What I Am" was the UK's 88th-best-selling single of 1999.

Track listings
Standard CD single and UK cassette single
 "What I Am" (radio version)
 "What I Am" (Gangstarr remix)
 "Weird (Save Yourself)" (featuring Wendy Page)

European CD single
 "What I Am" (radio version)
 "What I Am" (Gangstarr remix)

Personnel
Personnel are taken from the UK CD single liner notes.
 Edie Brickell – writing
 Kenny Withrow – writing
 Emma Bunton – vocals
 John Jorgenson – guitars
 Lindsay Edwards – guitars, keyboards
 Marcus Cliffe – bass
 Preston Heyman – percussion
 Tin Tin Out – production
 Stylorouge – design
 Rankin – photography

Charts

Weekly charts

Year-end charts

Certifications and sales

|}

References

1988 songs
1988 debut singles
1989 singles
1999 singles
Edie Brickell & New Bohemians songs
Emma Bunton songs
Geffen Records singles
Hut Records singles
Rock ballads
RPM Top Singles number-one singles
Song recordings produced by Pat Moran
Songs written by Edie Brickell
Sy Smith songs
Tin Tin Out songs
Trip hop songs
Virgin Records singles